Brian Richard Ede (born 9 March 1946) is a former Australian politician. He was the Labor member for Stuart in the Northern Territory Legislative Assembly from 1983 to 1996 and led Labor unsuccessfully to the 1994 territory election.

|}

References

1946 births
Living people
Members of the Northern Territory Legislative Assembly
Australian Labor Party members of the Northern Territory Legislative Assembly
Leaders of the Opposition in the Northern Territory